János Hrotkó (30 March 1922 – 23 March 2005) was a Hungarian football player and manager.

Career
Born in Gérce, Hrotkó began playing football with MTK Hungária.

Hrotkó signed with Serie A side Bari in 1946, and spent three seasons with the club before leaving for Serie B side Pro Sesto. He next moved to Spain where he would play two seasons for Real Zaragoza.

Hrotkó finished his playing career in Portugal, playing in the Portuguese Liga with Sporting Clube de Portugal and S.C. Covilhã.

References

External links
Profile at Enciclopediadelcalcio
Profile at Olhanense.net

1922 births
2005 deaths
Hungarian footballers
Hungarian expatriate footballers
Serie A players
Serie B players
Primeira Liga players
MTK Budapest FC players
S.S.C. Bari players
Real Zaragoza players
Sporting CP footballers
S.C. Covilhã players
Hungarian expatriate sportspeople in Portugal
Expatriate footballers in Spain
Expatriate footballers in Italy
Expatriate footballers in Portugal
Hungarian football managers
S.C. Olhanense managers
Leixões S.C. managers
C.S. Marítimo managers
Association football forwards